The Angeline Hanson Neble House is located at 2752 South 10th Street in South Omaha, Nebraska. Built in 1894 in the French Second Empire style, the house was designated an Omaha Landmark on November 18, 1980. It is one of very few examples of the French Second Empire style remaining in Omaha today.

References

Houses in Omaha, Nebraska
Omaha Landmarks
Houses completed in 1894